Kodi Ramakrishna (23 July 1949 – 22 February 2019) was an Indian film director, screenwriter and actor known for his works predominantly in Telugu cinema. One of the most prolific film directors of Telugu film industry, Kodi Ramakrishna has directed over 100 feature films in a variety of genres. He is known as a celluloid visionary who introduced high-end visual effects to the South Indian film industry through his supernatural fantasy films.

Kodi Ramakrishna began his career as an associate to Dasari Narayana Rao in Korikale Gurralaite (1979). His debuted as a director with the film Intlo Ramayya Veedhilo Krishnayya (1982). His filmography includes drama films like Intlo Ramayya Veedhilo Krishnayya (1982), Mangamma Gari Manavadu (1984), Maa Pallelo Gopaludu (1985), Srinivasa Kalyanam (1987), Aahuthi (1987), Muddula Mavayya (1989), Pelli (1997), and Dongaata (1997); social problem films such as Ankusam (1989), Bharat Bandh (1991), and Sathruvu (1991). He also directed spy films like Gudachari No.1 (1983), and Gudachari 117 (1989), and supernatural fantasy films like Ammoru (1995), Devi (1999), Devullu (2000), Anji (2004), and Arundhati (2009).

Arundhati won ten state Nandi Awards and became one of the highest grossing Telugu films ever at the time. In 2012, he received the state Raghupathi Venkaiah Award for his contribution to Telugu cinema.

Personal life
Kodi Ramakrishna was born on 23 July 1949 in Palakollu, West Godavari district of Andhra Pradesh. His career in the Indian cinema industry spanned more than 30 years.

His elder daughter Kodi Divya Deepti entered into film production with Nenu Meeku Baaga Kavalsinavaadini (2022).

Awards
In 2012, he received the state Raghupathi Venkaiah Award for his contribution to Telugu cinema.

Death
Kodi Ramakrishna died on 22 February 2019 in Hyderabad. He was under treatment at AIG Hospitals, Gachibowli for acute breathing problem.

Filmography
Director

Associate director
Korikale Gurralayite? (1979)

Actor
Mudilla Muchata (1985)
Attagaaroo Swagatam (1986)
Inti Donga (1987)
Aasti Mooredu Aasa Baaredu (1995)
Dongaata (1997)
Rainbow (2008)

References

External links

1949 births
2019 deaths
Telugu film directors
Tamil film directors
Film directors from Andhra Pradesh
People from West Godavari district
20th-century Indian film directors
21st-century Indian film directors
20th-century Indian male actors
Indian male film actors
Male actors from Andhra Pradesh
Male actors in Telugu cinema
Screenwriters from Andhra Pradesh
Telugu screenwriters
21st-century Indian male actors